Imagined Life is a podcast produced by Wondery and hosted by Virginia Madsen and Robbie Daymond. The podcast presents biographies of famous people in an unusual format. The first episode premiered on November 4, 2018 and 48 episodes have been produced by the end of the third season. Imagined Life won the 2018 podcast award by online publication Quartz  in the categories "Best podcast on the human condition" and "Best new podcast". The podcast will be developed into a TV documentary series by Universal Content Productions.

Format 
Each episode tells the life-story of one famous person. The subjects often include entertainers, political leaders, businessmen or sportsmen. An episode begins with a dramatic unresolved moment in the person's life, before going through the biography of the person in chronological order. The life events are presented in a dramatized way with reenactments of conversations.

The defining feature of "Imagined Life" is its second-person narration. Listeners are invited to imagine themselves being the famous person, although the person's identity is not revealed until the end. Identifying characteristics, such as gender, profession or country of origin, are intentionally omitted in the beginning and only gradually revealed among with other "clues" as the episode progresses. The creators describe this format as "second person biographical guessing game". Each episode ends with a reveal of the subject and recommended further reading.

The podcast also produces shorter episodes labeled as "Imagined Life Family" that cater to younger listeners, or for families to listen to together.

Episodes

References

External links
 

Audio podcasts
2018 podcast debuts